Əhmədabad (also, Akhmedabad) is a village and municipality in the Tovuz Rayon of Azerbaijan.  It has a population of 991.  The municipality consists of the villages of Əhmədabad, Avdal, and Qoçdərə.

References 

Populated places in Tovuz District